The 2004 South Australian Soccer Federation season was the 98th season of soccer in South Australia.

2004 SASF Premier League

The 2004 South Australian Premier League was the penultimate season of the SASF Premier League, the top-level domestic association football competition in South Australia. It was contested by 12 teams in a single 22-round league format, each team playing each of their opponents twice.

Finals

2004 SASF State League

The 2004 South Australian State League was the penultimate season of the SASF State League, as the second-highest domestic level association football competition in South Australia. It was contested by 12 teams in a single 22-round league format, each team playing each of their opponents twice.

Finals

See also
2004 SASF Premier League
2004 SASF State League
Football Federation South Australia
National Premier Leagues South Australia

References

2004 in Australian soccer
Football South Australia seasons